Gabriel Kanter-Webber is a British rabbi. He received semichah in summer 2022, after training at Leo Baeck College, and is rabbi of Brighton and Hove Progressive Synagogue, succeeding Rabbi Elizabeth Tikvah Sarah who retired in 2021. His arrival in Brighton was covered by local news.

He also serves as chaplain to the University of Sussex.

Education and career
Kanter-Webber studied his undergraduate degree at the University of Sussex, during which time he was also headteacher of the Progressive Synagogue's cheder. After graduating from university, he spent a year as a youth worker for LJY-Netzer.

He previously sat on the Board of Deputies of British Jews. In 2015, Jewish News listed him as number 7 on their list of 25 young Jewish leaders to watch.

Kanter-Webber also officiated at Britain's first bar mitzvah for a non-binary teen and at the first Jewish burial in the city of York for 8 centuries.

His Leo Baeck College dissertation calls for abusive rabbis to have their rabbinic ordination taken away.

In 2022, he reported a Board of Deputies of British Jews member for making racist comments about Desmond Tutu, sparking a Board of Deputies investigation.

Personal life
Kanter-Webber is married with one son.

Publications
 The Antisemitic Rabbi Who Became a Priest: Well, maybe in Tablet
 Why Does God Get It Wrong? in European Judaism
 Thank You God For Not Making Me A Slave in Slavery-Free Communities (chapter written with Mia Hasenson-Gross)

Links
 Brighton and Hove Progressive Synagogue
 Gabrielquotes, Rabbi Kanter-Webber's website

References 

Living people
British Liberal rabbis
Alumni of Leo Baeck College
Alumni of the University of Sussex
Year of birth missing (living people)